In geometry, the great rhombidodecahedron is a nonconvex uniform polyhedron, indexed as U73. It has 42 faces (30 squares, 12 decagrams), 120 edges and 60 vertices. Its vertex figure is a crossed quadrilateral.

Related polyhedra

It shares its vertex arrangement with the truncated great dodecahedron and the uniform compounds of 6 or 12 pentagonal prisms. It additionally shares its edge arrangement with the nonconvex great rhombicosidodecahedron (having the square faces in common), and with the great dodecicosidodecahedron (having the decagrammic faces in common).

Gallery

See also 
 List of uniform polyhedra

References

External links 
 

Uniform polyhedra